Baxter Mountain is a mountain located in the Catskill Mountains of New York southwest of Downsville. Big Fork Mountain is located southwest, Fuller Hill is located northeast and Stadel Mountain is located east-southeast of Baxter Mountain.

References

Mountains of Delaware County, New York
Mountains of New York (state)